or coastal defense ship was a type of naval ship used by the Imperial Japanese Navy during World War II for escort duty and coastal defense. The term escort ship was used by the United States Navy to describe this category of Japanese ships.

Description 
These ships were the Japanese equivalent to Allied destroyer escorts and frigates, with all three types of warships being built as a less expensive anti-submarine warfare alternative to fleet destroyers. While similar, destroyer escorts of the US Navy played a slightly different role to that of kaibōkan within the IJN, namely being that kaibōkan were diesel engine ships that never carried torpedo tubes, while many examples of Allied destroyer escort classes featured boiler and turbine machinery, and carried torpedoes; as a result of these design differences, kaibōkan often proved inferior to Allied destroyer escorts when undertaking escort roles. Additionally, because of these features of Allied destroyer escorts, they are more comparable to the Matsu-class, which the IJN considered to be , envisioned as general escorts with less firepower and speed.

Kaibōkan had some counterparts among Japan's Axis allies: the 10 Kriegsmarine escort ships of the F-class, and Amiral Murgescu of the Romanian Navy.

In the course of the war, the design was simplified and scaled down to permit larger numbers of vessels to be built more quickly.

Old definition 
Before the onset of World War II, kaibōkan was the catchall name for various ships, from battleships to sloops, which had become obsolete. For example, the battleship Mikasa was reclassified as a Kaibokan 1st class in 1921, after 19 years from her commissioning.

Classes
Ships of the first four classes were all named after Japanese islands.

(Ishigaki)
Also known as Type A  –  multi purpose patrol, escorts or minesweeper.
Main Engine: Diesel X 2, double shaft
Max Speed: 
Range: 
Fuel: Oil X 120t

(Matsuwa)
Modified Type A
Main Engine: Diesel X 2, double shaft
Max Speed: 
Range: 
Fuel: Oil X 120t

(Chiburi)
Also known as Type B
Main Engine: Diesel X 2, double shaft
Max Speed: 
Range: 
Fuel: Oil X 120t

(Okinawa)
Modified Type B
Main Engine: Diesel X 2, double shaft
Max Speed: 
Range: 
Fuel: Oil X 120t

Type C and Type D

Same design with different engines; diesels for Type C and turbines for Type D. More than 120 were mass-produced during the war, employing modular design method.

Others 
In addition, two former Chinese light cruisers were used, renamed Ioshima and Yasoshima.

See also
Convoy Hi-81
List of escort vessel classes of World War II

Footnotes

References

Notes

Sources 

Stories and Battle Histories of the IJN's Escorts 9 July 2011 By Bob Hackett, Sander Kingsepp and Peter Cundall
Kimata Jirō (木俣 滋郎). Military history of Japan's coastal defense ships (『日本海防艦戦史』). Toshu Publishing (図書出版社), 1994. p. 299

Further reading

 
Ship types